Chengguan is a town and the county seat of Mengcheng County, northwestern Anhui province, East China.

External links
Chengguan Government

Township-level divisions of Anhui